João Neto & Frederico are a pair of country music singers formed by Brazilian Joao Neto Nunes Goiás (Goiânia, August 12, 1979) and Frederick Augustus Silva Nunes (Goiânia, March 11, 1982). Coming from the country music university, they released their first album in 2004, Se Não Foi por Amor (If not for love).
The song was part of the double detonated the soundtrack to the novel Paradise, Rede Globo.

Discography

Albums
 2004 – Se Não Foi por Amor [CD]
 2006 – Modão – Ao Vivo [CD]
 2007 – Acústico Ao Vivo [CD e DVD]
 2008 – Ao Vivo [CD e DVD]
 2009 – Vale a Pena Sonhar [CD e DVD]
 2010 – Só Modão – Ao Vivo [CD e DVD]
 2011 – Tá Combinado [CD]
 2012 – Ao Vivo em Palmas [CD e DVD]
 2013 – Indecifrável [CD]

Singles
(International charting positions)

*Did not appear in the official Belgian Ultratop 50 charts, but rather in the bubbling under Ultratip charts.

References

Living people
Country music duos
Brazilian musical groups
1979 births
nunes